Kristal, meaning "crystal" in several languages, may refer to:

 Kristal (name), a given name and a surname
 KRISTAL Audio Engine, a digital audio editor
 The Kristal, a video game
 Kristal Kola, a Turkish soft drink

See also 
Kristall (disambiguation)
 Kristol, a surname
 Krystal (disambiguation)
Crystal (disambiguation), since many things called "Kristal" in their native languages